Kleitias (Greek: Κλειτίας, sometimes rendered as Klitias) was an ancient Athenian vase painter of the black-figure style who flourished c. 570–560 BCE. Kleitias' most celebrated work today is the François Vase (c. 570 BCE), which bears over two hundred figures in its six friezes. Painted inscriptions on four pots and one ceramic stand name Kleitias as their painter and Ergotimos as their potter, showing the craftsmen's close collaboration. A variety of other fragments have been attributed to him on a stylistic basis.

Signed works 

 Berlin, Antikensammlung V. I. 4604: Gordion cup from Gordion
 Florence, Museo Archeologico 4209 ("François vase" also known as  "Klitias krater"): Volute krater
 London, British Museum 1948.8-15.1 u. 2; 88.6-1.215, 424, 427 + Cambridge N 206: Fragments of a cup from Naukratis
 London, British Museum 88.6-1.237, 324, 426; 1948.8-15.3 u. 4: Fragments of a cup from Naukratis
New York, Metropolitan Museum 31.11.4: Stand from Vari

Bibliography 
 John Beazley: Attic Black-Figure Vase-Painters, Oxford 1956, p. 76-78.
 Bettina Kreuzer: Klitias, in: Künstlerlexikon der Antike Vol  1, 2001, p. 419-420.

See also 
Painter of Acropolis 606
Black-figure vase painting

External links 

 Klitias in the Beazley-Archive

Notes
 

6th-century BC deaths
6th-century BC Athenians
Ancient Greek vase painters
Year of birth unknown
Year of death unknown